Saki-ye Sofla (also Romanized as Sākī-ye Soflá and Sākī Soflá; also known as Sākī-ye Pā’īn and Shāqi) is a village in Shamsabad Rural District, in the Central District of Arak County, Markazi Province, Iran. At the 2006 census, its population was 204, in 56 families.

References 

Populated places in Arak County